Neodesha Township is a township in Wilson County, Kansas, United States.

History
Neodesha is an Osage Indian name meaning "meeting of the waters", or, the confluence of the Verdigris and Fall rivers.

References

Townships in Wilson County, Kansas
Townships in Kansas